Albert Austin Field (5 June 1884 – 27 July 1974) was an Australian rules footballer who played for the St Kilda Football Club in the Victorian Football League (VFL).

Notes

External links 

1884 births
1974 deaths
Australian rules footballers from Victoria (Australia)
St Kilda Football Club players